Alberta (Provisional District) was a federal electoral district in the Northwest Territories, Canada, that was represented in the House of Commons of Canada from 1887 to 1908.

History
The Alberta Provisional District was created in 1886 when the Northwest Territories gained representation in the House of Commons. It had the same boundaries of the District of Alberta, a subdivision of the Northwest Territories. In 1904, Edmonton and Calgary got their own MPs and the Alberta riding continued under the same name but only covering the southern part of Alberta district outside Calgary. 

In 1907, the Alberta riding was redistributed into Macleod and Medicine Hat.

Members of Parliament

This riding elected the following Members of Parliament:

Election results

See also 

 List of Canadian federal electoral districts
 Past Canadian electoral districts

References

External links 

Former federal electoral districts of Northwest Territories
Former federal electoral districts of Alberta